Stanley Bigsby Sutton (August 9, 1895 – October 1967) was an American football coach.  He served as the head football coach at Virginia Agricultural and Mechanical College and Polytechnic Institute (VPI)—now known as Virginia Tech—for one season on 1920, compiling a record of 4–6.

Head coaching record

References

External links
 

1895 births
1967 deaths
Virginia Tech Hokies football coaches
Springfield College (Massachusetts) alumni
People from Wilmette, Illinois